Oroville may refer to:

 Oroville, California, United States
 Oroville, Washington, United States

Other uses
 Lake Oroville, in Butte County, California, USA
 Oroville Dam, in Butte County, California, USA
 Oroville Municipal Airport, in Butte County, California, USA

See also
Oraville (disambiguation)
Orville (disambiguation)
Auroville, experimental community in India